Lužice is a municipality and village in Hodonín District in the South Moravian Region of the Czech Republic. It has about 2,900 inhabitants.

History
The first written mention of Lužice is from 1250. From 1511, it was part of the Hodonín domain.

The municipality was heavily damaged by the 2021 South Moravia tornado.

References

Villages in Hodonín District
Moravian Slovakia